Loye is a surname. Notable people with this name include:

 Aleksandr Loye (born 1983), Russian actor
 David Elliot Loye (1925-2022), American author and psychologist
 Charles Auguste Loye, real name of George Montbard (1841–1905), French artist
 James Loye (born 1979), British actor
 Kate Loye (born 1993), New Zealand football player
 Loye H. Miller (1874–1970), American paleontologist
 Mal Loye, English cricket player
 Paul Loye (1861–1890), French physician

See also

Places
 La Loye, France
 La Vieille-Loye, France
 Loye-sur-Arnon, France